Kudnur Dam, is an earthfill dam on local river near Chandgad, Kolhapur district in state of Maharashtra in India.

Specifications

Purpose
Irrigation

See also
 Dams in Maharashtra
Chitri Dam
Radhanagari Dam
 List of reservoirs and dams in India

References

Dams in Kolhapur district
Dams completed in 2005
2005 establishments in Maharashtra